A regular temperament is any tempered system of musical tuning such that each frequency ratio is obtainable as a product of powers of a finite number of generators, or generating frequency ratios. For instance, in 12-TET, the system of music most commonly used in the Western world, the generator is a tempered fifth (700 cents), which is the basis behind the circle of fifths.

When only two generators are needed, with one of them the octave, this is called "linear temperament". The best-known example of a linear temperaments is meantone temperament, where the generating intervals are usually given in terms of a slightly flattened fifth and the octave. Other linear temperaments include the schismatic temperament of Hermann von Helmholtz and miracle temperament.

Mathematical description 

If the generators are all of the prime numbers up to a given prime p, we have what is called p-limit just intonation. Sometimes some irrational number close to one of these primes is substituted (an example of tempering) to favour other primes, as in twelve tone equal temperament where 3 is tempered to 2 to favour 2, or in quarter-comma meantone where 3 is tempered to 2 to favor 2 and 5.

In mathematical terminology, the products of these generators define a free abelian group. The number of independent generators is the rank of an abelian group. The rank-one tuning systems are equal temperaments, all of which can be spanned with only a single generator, though they don't have to be integer-based equal temperaments. The non-octave scales of Wendy Carlos, such as the Alpha scale, use one generator that does not stack up to the octave. A rank-two temperament has two generators.  Hence, meantone is a rank-2 temperament.

In studying regular temperaments, it can be useful to regard the temperament as having a map from p-limit just intonation (for some prime p) to the set of tempered intervals. To properly classify a temperament's dimensionality one must determine how many of the given generators are independent, because its description may contain redundancies. Another way of considering this problem is that the rank of a temperament should be the rank of its image under this map.

For instance, a harpsichord tuner it might think of quarter-comma meantone tuning as having three generators—the octave, the just major third (5:4) and the quarter-comma tempered fifth—but because four consecutive tempered fifths produces a just major third, the major third is redundant, reducing it to a rank-two temperament.

Other methods of linear and multilinear algebra can be applied to the map. For instance, a map's kernel (otherwise known as "nullspace") consists of p-limit intervals called commas, which are a property useful in describing temperaments.

External links 
  
 A. Milne, W. A. Sethares, and J. Plamondon,  Isomorphic Controllers and Dynamic Tuning— Invariant Fingering Over a Tuning Continuum, Computer Music Journal, Winter 2007
 Holmes, Rich, Microtonal scales: Rank-2 2-step (MOS) scales
 Smith, Gene Ward, Regular Temperaments
 Barbieri, Patrizio. Enharmonic instruments and music, 1470-1900. (2008) Latina, Il Levante Libreria Editrice

Musical temperaments